Gates is a town in Monroe County, New York, United States. The town is named after General Horatio Gates. The population was 28,400 at the 2010 census. Gates and North Gates are census-designated places located within the town's boundaries.

History
The town of Gates was organized in 1797 as "Northampton" in Ontario County. In 1808 the town was subdivided and the part still called Northampton was renamed "Gates" and incorporated on April 1, 1813, in honor of General Horatio Gates. In 1821 Monroe County was formed, including the town of Gates. Parts of the town were later detached to form the city of Rochester and the town of Greece, both of which now border the town.

The Franklin Hinchey House was listed on the National Register of Historic Places in 1983.

Geography

Government

The legislative branch of the government of the town is a four-member town council whose members are elected every four years. The members of the town council are currently Chris B. Diponzio, Steve Tucciarello, Andrew Loughlin and Lee Cordero. The Executive branch of the town government is the Town Supervisor, who is elected every two years. The current town supervisor is Cosmo Giunta, who was appointed town supervisor on November 7, 2018.

Economy 
Wegmans Food Markets has its headquarters in the town. Rochester Tech Park, the former site of a Kodak manufacturing plant that is now home to companies such as Kodak Alaris, Pepsi Bottling Group, Citigroup, and Maximus Inc., is located within the town as well.

Demographics

As of the census of 2000, there were 29,275 people, 11,730 households, and 8,046 families residing in the CDP.  The population density was 1,921.8 people per square mile (742.2/km2).  There were 12,049 housing units at an average density of 791.0 per square mile (305.5/km2).  The racial makeup of the CDP was 88.62% White, 6.38% African American, 0.17% Native American, 2.36% Asian, 0.04% Pacific Islander, 1.09% from other races, and 1.35% from two or more races. Hispanic or Latino of any race were 2.92% of the population.

There were 11,730 households, out of which 28.6% had children under the age of 18 living with them, 53.8% were married couples living together, 10.7% had a female householder with no husband present, and 31.4% were non-families. 26.5% of all households were made up of individuals, and 12.1% had someone living alone who was 65 years of age or older.  The average household size was 2.48 and the average family size was 3.01.

In the CDP the population was spread out, with 22.6% under the age of 18, 6.9% from 18 to 24, 28.9% from 25 to 44, 24.2% from 45 to 64, and 17.4% who were 65 years of age or older.  The median age was 40 years. For every 100 females, there were 92.4 males.  For every 100 females age 18 and over, there were 88.5 males.

The median income for a household in the CDP was $45,709, and the median income for a family was $53,964. Males had a median income of $38,815 versus $29,024 for females. The per capita income for the CDP was $21,353.  About 4.3% of families and 5.6% of the population were below the poverty line, including 5.2% of those under age 18 and 6.8% of those age 65 or over.

Education

Gates is served by the Gates Chili Central School District.

Notable person
Henry G. Danforth, former US Congressman

Communities and locations in Gates 
Elmgrove - a hamlet on Routes 386 and 31.
Gates – a census-defined district in the northeastern part of the town.
Gates Center – a hamlet in the eastern part of the town at the junction of NY 33 and Howard Road.
North Gates – a hamlet (and census-designated place) in the northeastern part of the town on Long Pond Road.
Tressmar - a hamlet on the conjoined NY 33A (Chili Avenue) and NY 204.

References

External links

 Town of Gates webpage

Rochester metropolitan area, New York
Towns in Monroe County, New York